Hannes Coetzee (born 1944) is a guitarist from the Karoo region in South Africa. He is mainly known for his unique playing technique using a spoon in his mouth to play slide guitar. This playing technique is called 'optel en knyp', which roughly translates to "pick and pinch".
Coetzee reached a broader audience when David Kramer's documentary Karoo Kitaar Blues was released in 2003.

References

External links
 Short biography on David Kramer's homepage (scroll down)

Further reading
 "Spoon Me a Tune, Hannes" on Ideaconnection

Coloured South African people
South African people of Dutch descent
South African composers
South African male composers
1944 births
Living people